Pablo Sebastián Carreras (born 3 March 1995) is an Argentine footballer who plays as a right back for Enosis Neon Paralimni.

Club career
Carreras made his professional debut for River Plate on 18 July 2015, playing the full 90 minutes of a 5–1 win in the season's Primera División away to Atlético de Rafaela. A week later, he made his only other appearance of the campaign, a 3–1 win over Colón at the Monumental, being substituted for Tabaré Viúdez after 59 minutes.

International career
Carreras represented Argentina at the 2011 South American Under-17 Football Championship and the 2011 FIFA U-17 World Cup.

References

External links

1995 births
Living people
Association football midfielders
Argentine footballers
Club Atlético River Plate footballers
Argentine Primera División players